Chatchai-decha Butdee, formerly Chatchai Butdee (born 26 March 1985), is a Thai boxer who won a bronze medal at the 2013 World Championships. At the 2012 Summer Olympics, he competed in the flyweight, but was defeated in his second bout. At the 2016 Summer Olympics, Butdee was again eliminated in his second bout, despite controlling the fight.

Butdee is married and has one daughter. He has a degree in public administration from Thongsook College and is a fan of the English football club Arsenal F.C. In 2013 he was named the Male Athlete of the Year by the Sports Authority of Thailand.

Butdee has an affiliation with the 1st Army Arai Boxing Club, Thailand.

After being eliminated in the quarterfinals of the 2020 Summer Olympics featherweight (losing 3-2 to Cuba's Lázaro Álvarez), he announced his retirement at the age of 36 after having competed in three Summer Olympics.

References

External links 

 
 
 

1985 births
Living people
Chatchai-decha Butdee
Chatchai-decha Butdee
Flyweight boxers
Bantamweight boxers
Featherweight boxers
Boxers at the 2012 Summer Olympics
Boxers at the 2016 Summer Olympics
Chatchai-decha Butdee
AIBA World Boxing Championships medalists
Boxers at the 2010 Asian Games
Boxers at the 2014 Asian Games
Boxers at the 2018 Asian Games
Chatchai-decha Butdee
Chatchai-decha Butdee
Southeast Asian Games medalists in boxing
Competitors at the 2009 Southeast Asian Games
Competitors at the 2011 Southeast Asian Games
Competitors at the 2013 Southeast Asian Games
Competitors at the 2017 Southeast Asian Games
Chatchai-decha Butdee
Boxers at the 2020 Summer Olympics